The Silver Condor Award for Best Ibero-American film , given by the Argentine Film Critics Association, awards the best Ibero-American film each year. The first award was given in 2005.

 
Argentine Film Critics Association
Ibero-American awards